The 42nd Assembly District of Wisconsin is one of 99 districts in the Wisconsin State Assembly.  Located in central Wisconsin, the district comprises most of Columbia County, as well as northwest Dodge County, southern Green Lake County, and parts of southeast Marquette County and western Fond du Lac County.  The district includes the cities of Fox Lake, Lodi, Markesan, Montello, and Ripon, as well as the villages of Brandon, Cambria, Fairwater, Friesland, Kingston, Marquette, Poynette, Randolph, Rio, and Wyocena.  The district also contains Ripon College and the historic Little White Schoolhouse in Ripon—the birthplace of the Republican Party.  The district is represented by Republican Jon Plumer, since June 2018.

The 42nd Assembly district is located within Wisconsin's 14th Senate district, along with the 40th and 41st Assembly districts.

History
The district was created in the 1972 redistricting act (1971 Wisc. Act 304) which first established the numbered district system, replacing the previous system which allocated districts to specific counties.  The 42nd district was drawn roughly in line with the boundaries of the previous Outagamie County 1st district (almost all of the city of Appleton).

The 42nd district boundaries have shifted significantly over the various redistrictings of the state, but the location of the district has remained consistent in south-central Wisconsin since the 1983 redistricting.

List of past representatives

References 

Wisconsin State Assembly districts
Columbia County, Wisconsin
Dane County, Wisconsin
Dodge County, Wisconsin
Fond du Lac County, Wisconsin
Green Lake County, Wisconsin
Marquette County, Wisconsin